Gummy worms also called Gummi Worms are a popular type of gummy candy that are shaped like worms. They are made from a mixture of sugar, corn syrup, gelatin, and flavorings, and are typically sold in plastic bags or containers.

History 
The first gummy worms were created by the German candy maker Haribo in the early 1980s. The company's "Goldbären" (Gold Bears) were a popular gummy candy, and the worm shape was created as a new twist on this existing product. Gummy worms quickly became popular in the United States and have been a staple candy ever since. The worm shape quickly gained popularity in Europe and soon made its way to the United States. Haribo's gummy worms were initially imported and sold in specialty candy stores but soon became a mainstream candy. Other candy companies also started to produce their own versions of the candy, with different flavors and colors being introduced to the market. The gummy worm's unique shape and texture made it a versatile candy that could be used in various ways, such as being a topping for ice cream sundaes and an ingredient in baking recipes. Gummy worms have also become a popular choice for Halloween trick-or-treaters and party favors, and are used in various entertainment venues such as mini-golf courses and carnival games. The gummy worm's lasting popularity is a testament to its enduring appeal and the joy it brings to candy lovers everywhere.

Ingredients 
Gummy worms are made from a mixture of sugar, corn syrup, gelatin, and flavorings. They are typically colored with food dyes and have a fruity flavor. The ingredients are mixed together and heated until they form a liquid. The liquid is then poured into molds shaped like worms and left to cool and harden. Once the gummy worms are removed from the molds, they are often dusted with a light coating of sugar to give them a slightly sticky texture. It is worth noting that Gummy candies are not recommended for people with specific dietary restrictions such as vegetarians and vegans as it contains Gelatin which is derived from animal collagen.

Popularity 
Gummy worms have become a beloved candy for people of all ages. The candy's unique shape and texture, paired with a wide variety of flavors and colors, have made it a staple in the candy industry. The gummy worm's fun and playful shape makes it a favorite among children, and its variety of colors and flavors makes it appealing to adults as well. Gummy worms are also popular as a topping for ice cream sundaes and as an ingredient in baking recipes. They have become a popular choice for Halloween trick-or-treaters and party favors, and are used in various entertainment venues such as mini-golf courses and carnival games. Gummy worms have also become a cultural phenomenon, with multiple brands producing them, and have been featured in various media such as music videos, TV shows, and movies as a symbol of nostalgia and fun. Brands such as Trolli, the creator of Sour gummy worms and other varieties of gummy candies, have become a household name. In conclusion, gummy worms popularity is undeniable and continues to bring joy to people of all ages, making it a beloved candy for over four decades.

Variations 
Gummy worms come in a wide variety of flavors, colors, and sizes. The traditional gummy worm flavor is a fruity taste, but more recently, gummy worms have been produced in a wide range of flavors such as sour, chocolate, and even hot and spicy. The most popular gummy worm flavor is the classic fruity taste, but sour gummy worms have become increasingly popular in recent years, especially among adults. These sour gummy worms have been created by brands such as Trolli, which have also produced other varieties of gummy candies. Some gummy worms are also coated in sour sugar or have a sour gel filling, which adds an extra layer of tanginess. Some gummy worms are also shaped into different forms such as rings, brains, and even dinosaurs. Gummy worms also come in different sizes, from bite-size to large worms that can be cut into smaller pieces. With the wide variety of flavors, colors, and sizes, gummy worms have something to offer for everyone.

References 

Gummi candies